The 1940 William & Mary Norfolk Division Braves football team represented the Norfolk Division of the College of William and Mary, now referred to as Old Dominion University, during the 1940 college football season. They finished with a 0–6 record, and went all six games without scoring a single point; they also allowed no less than eighteen points in every game. This was the last season of football for Old Dominion until they reinstated the football program 69 years later, in 2009.

Schedule

References

William and Mary Norfolk Division
Old Dominion Monarchs football seasons
College football winless seasons
William and Mary Norfolk Division Braves football